The Mhlontlo Local Municipality council consists of fifty-one members elected by mixed-member proportional representation. Twenty-six councillors are elected by first-past-the-post voting in twenty-six wards, while the remaining twenty-five are chosen from party lists so that the total number of party representatives is proportional to the number of votes received. In the election of 1 November 2021 the African National Congress (ANC) won a majority of forty seats.

Results 
The following table shows the composition of the council after past elections.

December 2000 election

The following table shows the results of the 2000 election.

March 2006 election

The following table shows the results of the 2006 election.

May 2011 election

The following table shows the results of the 2011 election.

August 2016 election

The following table shows the results of the 2016 election.

November 2021 election

The following table shows the results of the 2021 election.

By-elections from November 2021
The following by-elections were held to fill vacant ward seats in the period from November 2021.

After the death of the African National Congress (ANC) councillor in ward 20, a by-election was held on 30 November 2022. Besides the ANC, the United Democratic Movement (UDM), Economic Freedom Fighters (EFF), African Transformation Movement (ATM) and the Independent South African National Civic Organisation (Isanco) contested. The ANC candidate retained the seat for the party, winning 70% of the votes.

References

Mhlontlo
Elections in the Eastern Cape
OR Tambo District Municipality